Carol Rumens FRSL (born 10 December 1944) is a British poet.

Life
Carol Rumens was born in Forest Hill, South London. She won a scholarship to grammar school and later studied Philosophy at London University, but left before completing her degree. She gained a Postgraduate Diploma in Writing for the Stage (with Distinction) from City College Manchester in 2002.

She taught at University of Kent at Canterbury (1983–85), Queen's University Belfast (1991–93 and 1995–98), University College Cork (1994), University of Stockholm (1999), and University of Hull. As visiting Professor of Creative Writing, she has taught at the University of Wales, Bangor, and later at the University of Hull.

Rumens was Poetry Editor for the publisher Quarto (1982–84) and the Literary Review (1984–88). Her work has appeared in The Guardian and Harper's. She was elected a Fellow of the Royal Society of Literature in 1984.

Awards
 1981: Alice Hunt Bartlett Award (joint winner), forUnplayed Music
 1981: New Statesman Prudence Farmer Award, for An Easter Garland
 1984: Cholmondeley Award
 1998: Belfast Arts Award for Literature (shortlist), for Holding Pattern
 1998: Forward Poetry Prize (Best Single Poem) (shortlisted for "A Day in the Life of Farmer Dream")
 2001: Cardiff International Poetry Competition (Fourth Prize, for "Kings of the Playground")
 2001: National Poetry Competition ("Stay in Touch")
 2002: Forward Poetry Prize (Best Single Poem) (shortlist)

Works

Poetry
 
 
 A Necklace of Mirrors   Ulsterman, 1978
 
 
 
 
 Icon Waves   The Star Wheel Press, 1986
 
 
 
 
 
 
 
 
 
 
 
 The Emigree

Novels

Editor
 
Slipping Glimpses: Winter Poetry Supplement (editor), Poetry Book Society, 1985
 
 Two Women Dancing: New and Selected Poems of Elizabeth Bartlett (editor), Bloodaxe, 1995
 Old City, New Rumours: A Hull Anthology (editor Five Leaves Press, 2010

Plays
 Nearly Siberia (Pascal Theatre Company, Newcastle and London, 1989)
 The Freak of the Week Show (EyeSpy Theatre Company, East Didsbury Studio, Manchester, 2001)
 Suzanne Hecabe (Arden School of Theatre, Manchester, 2002).

Translations
 Pencil Letter /Irina Ratushinskaya (translator), Bloodaxe, 1988
 
 After Pushkin (contributor), Carcanet, 2000 with Yuri Drobyshev
 Yevgenii Rein: Selected Poems (translator), Bloodaxe, 2001

Non-fiction
Self into Song: Newcastle/Bloodaxe Poetry Lectures, Bloodaxe, 2006

References

External links
"Carol Rumens", doollee
 "Poem of the week: Christmas at Sea by Robert Louis Stevenson, Robert Louis Stevenson telescopes the distance between a cosy Christmas scene and a life-and-death struggle on the high seas", Carol Rumens, The Guardian, 24 December 2012

1944 births
Living people
English women poets
People from Forest Hill, London
Alumni of the University of London
Academics of the University of Kent
Academics of Queen's University Belfast
Academics of the University of Hull
Academics of the University of Wales
Academics of University College Cork
Academic staff of Stockholm University
Fellows of the Royal Society of Literature